Wann is an unincorporated community and census-designated place in Saunders County, Nebraska, United States.

Demographics

History
A post office was established at Wann in 1908, and remained in operation until it was discontinued in 1950.

References

Census-designated places in Nebraska
Unincorporated communities in Saunders County, Nebraska
Unincorporated communities in Nebraska